Citramalic acid is the organic compound with the formula HO2CCH2C(CH3)(OH)CO2H.  A chiral compound, it is related structurally to malic acid.

Synthesis and reactions
Citramalic acid is the hydrated derivative of mesaconic acid,  The hydration is catalyzed by mesaconyl-C4-CoA hydratase:
HO2CCH=C(CH3)CO2H  +  H2O  →   HO2CCH2C(CH3)(OH)CO2H
The same conversion can be achieved in vitro.

The enzyme (S)-citramalyl-CoA lyase converts citramalyl-CoA to acetyl-CoA and pyruvate.

References

Dicarboxylic acids